The Illinois Attorney General is the highest legal officer of the state of Illinois in the United States.  Originally an appointed office, it is now an office filled by statewide election.  Based in Chicago and Springfield, Illinois, the attorney general is responsible for providing legal counsel for the various state agencies including the Governor of Illinois and Illinois General Assembly, and conducting all legal affairs pertaining to the state.

The office of the Illinois Attorney General was established on December 3, 1818, based on guidelines adopted by a state constitutional convention. The attorney general is second (behind the Lieutenant Governor) in the line of succession to the office of Governor of Illinois. The first person to fulfill the duties of the office was Daniel Pope Cook who only served eleven days, and was later elected to the United States Congress.  Cook County was named in his honor.

The current holder of the office is Kwame Raoul.

Role 
Under the Constitution of Illinois, the attorney general is the state's chief legal officer, and has the powers and duties prescribed by law. The attorney general's duties include advocating for the people of Illinois, working with the General Assembly to push for new legislation, and litigating to ensure that state laws are followed. The state's attorney general Act specifies several duties, including:

 Represent the people of Illinois before the Supreme Court where the state or the people of the state are interested parties
 Prosecute all proceedings and actions in favor of the state
 Defend state officers acting in their official capacities in any actions or proceedings against them
 Consult with and advise the state's attorneys
 Investigate violations of all statutes that the attorney general has a duty to enforce
 Advise the Governor and other state officers, and give written opinions on legal or constitutional matters when requested
 Give written opinions to the General Assembly or any of its committees when requested
 Prepare drafts of contracts in which the state is interested
 Attend, present evidence to, and prosecute indictments by the statewide grand jury
 Ensure the proper allocation of funds appropriated to public institutions, and prosecute breaches of trust
The attorney general also oversees the Public Access Counselor, which is responsible for enforcing the state's Freedom of Information Act and Open Meetings Act.

List of attorneys general
Parties

See also

 List of law enforcement agencies in Illinois

References

External links
 Illinois Attorney General official website
 Illinois Attorney General articles at ABA Journal
 News and Commentary at FindLaw
 Illinois Compiled Statutes at Law.Justia.com
 U.S. Supreme Court Opinions - "Cases with title containing: State of Illinois" at FindLaw
 Illinois State Bar Association
 Illinois Attorney General Lisa Madigan profile at National Association of Attorneys General
 Press releases at Illinois Attorney General

 
State law enforcement agencies of Illinois
1818 establishments in the United States